The 1888 Yale Bulldogs football team represented Yale University in the 1888 college football season. In its first season under head coach Walter Camp, the team compiled a 13–0 record, did not allow a single point, and outscored opponents by a total of 694 to 0.  The team has been retrospectively named as the national champion by the Billingsley Report, Helms Athletic Foundation, Houlgate System, National Championship Foundation, and Parke H. Davis.

Yale's point total was the largest ever made by a Yale team. The team scored 126 touchdowns and kicked 69 goals from touchdown and eight goals from the field. Its scoring leaders included William Wurtenburg with 20 touchdowns, Lee McClung with 16, Charles O. Gill with 14, Frederic W. "Kid" Wallace with eight, William Herbert Corbin with six, and John A. Hartwell and Ashbel Barney Newell with five each.

Head coach Walter Camp and five players (Corbin, Pudge Heffelfinger, McClung, Amos Alonzo Stagg, and George Washington Woodruff) have been inducted into the College Football Hall of Fame.

Schedule

Game summaries

Wesleyan (first game)
The starters for Yale were William Herbert Corbin (centre and captain), Brooks (right guard), Pudge Heffelfinger (left guard), William Rhodes (right tackle), Charles O. Gill (left tackle), William Wurtenburg (quarterback), Samuel B. Morison (back), B. Morrison (back), Robinson (right end), Townsend (left end), and Herbert McBride (fullback).

Rutgers
On October 6, 1888, Yale defeated Rutgers, 65–0, on Yale Field in New Haven. Due to rain, only 50 spectators attended the game. The game consisted of 35 minutes of playing time. Team captain William Herbert Corbin had his knee "thrown out of joint" during the game. Yale's starters were Robinson, William Rhodes, Bert Hanson, Corbin (centre), Pudge Heffelfinger, Charles O. Gill, Townsend, William Wurtenburg (quarterback), Samuel B. Morison (halfback), B. Morrison (halfback), Herbert McBride (fullback).

Penn (first game)
On October 13, 1888, starting at 3:05 p.m., Yale defeated Penn, 34–0, before a crowd of less than 1,000 at the 37th and Spruce Street grounds in Philadelphia. Yale's starting lineup in the game consisted of Frederic W. "Kid" Wallace (rusher), Charles O. Gill (rusher), Pudge Heffelfinger (rusher), William Herbert Corbin (rusher), Gordon B. Pike (rusher), William Rhodes (rusher), Samuel B. Morison (rusher), Clifford B. Twombly (quarterback), William P. Graves (halfback), William Wurtenburg (halfback), and Herbert McBride (fullback).

Wesleyan (second game)
On Tuesday, October 16, 1888, Yale played its second game against Wesleyan, prevailing by a 46–0 at Wesleyan's home field in Middletown, Connecticut. Yale's starting lineup was Frederic W. "Kid" Wallace (rusher), Bert Hanson (rusher), Pudge Heffelfinger (rusher), William Herbert Corbin (centre and captain), Gordon S. Pike (rusher), William Rhodes (rusher), McClintock (rusher), Clifford B. Twombly (quarterback), William Wurtenburg (halfback), Lee McClung (halfback), Herbert McBride (fullback).

Amherst (first game)
On Friday, October 19, 1888, starting at 3:20 p.m., Yale defeated Amherst, 39–0, on Amherst's home grounds in Amherst, Massachusetts.

Williams
On October 20, 1888, Yale defeated Williams, 30–0, on Williams' home field in Williamstown, Massachusetts. Yale's 30 points was the lowest score by a Yale team against any opponent other than a Harvard or Princeton team. Yale's starting lineup was Frederic W. "Kid" Wallace (rush line), Bert Hanson (rush line), Pudge Heffelfinger (rush line), William Herbert Corbin (rush line), Gordon Pike (centre), William Rhodes, Morrison, William Wurtenburg (quarterback), William P. Graves (halfback), Herbert McBride (halfback), and William T. Bull (fullback).

Stevens
On October 27, 1888, Yale defeated , 69–0. The game was played in drizzling rain at Yale Field in New Haven. Yale scored 44 of its points in the last inning.

Crescent Athletic Club
On Tuesday, November 6, 1888, in a game starting at 11:15 a.m., Yale defeated the Crescent Athletic Club, 28–0, before a crowd of nearly 1,600 at Washington Park in Brooklyn. Yale's starting lineup was Frederic W. "Kid" Wallace (rusher), Charles O. Gill (rusher), Ashbel Barney Newell (rusher), William Herbert Corbin (rusher), Brewster (rusher), Pudge Heffelfinger (rusher), Amos Alonzo Stagg (rusher), William Wurtenburg (quarterback), Lee McClung (halfback), Perry W. Harvey (halfback), and Herbert McBride (fullback).

Wesleyan (third game)
On November 17, 1888, Yale defeated , 105–0, at Yale Field in New Haven, Connecticut. Yale's tally of 105 points was its highest of the season and was the total of eight touchdowns (32 points), 11 goals (66 points), one goal from field (five points), and one safety (two points). Charles O. Gill was credited with the best play of the game, running three quarters of the field with Amos Alonzo Stagg acting "as a sort of bodyguard in the race for six points."  Yale's starting lineup was Stagg (rusher), John A. Hartwell (rusher), George Washington Woodruff (rusher), Ashbel Barney Newell (center rush), Pudge Heffelfinger (rusher), Gill (rusher), Frederic W. "Kid" Wallace (rusher), William Wurtenburg (quarterback), Lee McClung (halfback), Herbert McBride (halfback), and William T. Bull (fullback).

Princeton
On November 24, 1888, Yale defeated Princeton, 10–0, at the Polo Grounds in Manhattan. Both teams were undefeated prior to the game which was billed as a contest for the intercollegiate football championship. The attendance was variously placed at 10,000 to 20,000 with The New York Times estimated the crowd at a little less than 15,000, evenly split between Princeton and Yale partisans. Yale's 10 points were scored on two goals kicked from the field by Yale's fullback William T. Bull. As the game ended, a "mob" of Yale supporters ran onto the field and carried the victorious players off on their shoulders. The starting lineup for Yale consisted of Frederic W. "Kid" Wallace (rusher), Charles O. Gill (rusher), George Washington Woodruff (centre rush), William Herbert Corbin (rusher), William Rhodes (rusher), Pudge Heffelfinger (rusher), and Amos Alonzo Stagg (rusher), William Wurtenburg (quarterback), Lee McClung (halfback), William P. Graves (halfback), and Bull (fullback).

Roster
The 1888 season was a transitional season where linemen were still generally referred to generically as "rushers" or the "rush line", but were at other times referred to by reference to specific positions in the line. Where available from game accounts, both designations are included below.
 Brooks - right guard
 William T. Bull - fullback
 William Herbert Corbin - rusher/centre and captain
 Charles O. Gill - rusher/left tackle
 William P. Graves - halfback
 John A. Hartwell - rusher
 Bert Hanson - rusher
 Perry W. Harvey - halfback 
 Pudge Heffelfinger - rusher/left guard
 Herbert McBride - halfback/fullback
 McClintock - rusher
 Lee McClung - halfback
 Samuel B. Morison - rusher/back
 B. Morrison - back 
 Ashbel Barney Newell - centre rush
 Gordon B. Pike - rusher/centre
 William Rhodes - rusher/right tackle
 Robinson - right end 
 Amos Alonzo Stagg - rusher
 Townsend - left end
 Clifford Twombly - quarterback
 Frederic W. "Kid" Wallace - rusher
 George Washington Woodruff - rusher
 William Wurtenburg - quarterback/halfback

References

Yale
Yale Bulldogs football seasons
College football national champions
College football undefeated seasons
Yale Bulldogs football